15 Aquilae (abbreviated 15 Aql) is a star in the equatorial constellation of Aquila. 15 Aquilae is the Flamsteed designation; it also bears the Bayer designation h Aquilae. The apparent visual magnitude is 5.41, so it is faintly visible to the naked eye.

With a stellar classification of K1 III, the spectrum of 15 Aquilae matches a giant star with an age of roughly four billion years. At this stage of its evolution, the outer atmosphere of the star has expanded to 14 times the radius of the Sun. It is radiating 83 times the Sun's luminosity into space at an effective temperature of 4,560 K. This heat gives it the orange-hued glow of a K-type star.

This star is most likely a member of the thin disk population of the Milky Way.

References

External links
 Image 15 Aquilae

Aquilae, h
177442 and 177463
Aquila (constellation)
093717
K-type giants
Aquilae, 15
7225
BD-04 4684